The New Fellas is the second studio album by British indie rock band The Cribs, released in June 2005. It placed at No. 11 in NMEs "Albums of the Year" edition, 2005.

Background
Having become more of a part of the music scene following the release of their self-titled debut album, much of The New Fellas''' lyrics deal with the band's disgust at the attitudes of their so-called peers.

Recording
The Cribs chose Edwyn Collins to produce The New Fellas because they were fans of his old band Orange Juice and because he shared their attitude towards the music industry.

Reception
In 2007, the song "Hey Scenesters!" was named one of the "Greatest Indie Anthems Ever" by music magazine NME.

In December 2009, Q Magazine chose it as one of their "Albums of the Century" in their year end issue.

In October 2015, The New Fellas was inducted into the DIY'' Hall of Fame.

Reissue
On July 29, 2022, The Cribs released reissues of their first three albums, the main reason for which was because the albums' vinyl editions had been out of print for some time. After regaining the rights and master tapes for the albums through the legal battle that caused the band's inactivity several years prior, they spent 2021 sifting through their archives for bonus material to include on the reissues. All three reissued albums entered the Top Ten of the midweek UK Albums Chart.

Accolades

Track listing

Charts

References

2005 albums
The Cribs albums
Wichita Recordings albums
Albums produced by Edwyn Collins